Pseudoterpna coronillaria, the Jersey emerald or gorse emerald, is a moth of the family Geometridae. The species was first described by Jacob Hübner in 1796. It is known from Spain, Portugal, the Pyrenees, western and southern France, Corsica, Sardinia, Sicily, Italy, Samos, Rhodes, Turkey, Israel, Lebanon, northern Jordan and North Africa. It has not been reported from mainland Great Britain, but is present on Jersey, where it was previously overlooked as a form of the grass emerald, until 2001 when it was correctly identified.

Adults resemble Pseudoterpna pruinata, but are generally greyer looking with just a hint of a greenish tinge, and have a sprinkling of darker scales.

They are on wing in June and July in western Europe.

The larvae feed on Genista tinctoria, Ulex species and broom.

Subspecies
Pseudoterpna coronillaria coronillaria (Spain, Portugal, the Pyrenees, western and southern France, Corsica, Sardinia, north-western Italy up to northern Tuscany)
Pseudoterpna coronillaria algirica Wehrli, 1929 (North Africa)
Pseudoterpna coronillaria cinerascens (Zeller, 1847) (western Turkey, Samos, Rhodes)
Pseudoterpna coronillaria axillaria Guenée, [1858] (southern Turkey, Lebanon)
Pseudoterpna coronillaria halperini Hausmann, 1996 (Israel, northern Jordan)
Pseudoterpna coronillaria flamignii Hausmann, 1997 (central and southern Italy, Sicily)

References

External links

Lepiforum e.V.

Pseudoterpnini
Moths described in 1796
Moths of Europe
Moths of Asia
Taxa named by Jacob Hübner
Moths of Africa